Operation Northern Iraq was a cross-border operation by the Turkish Armed Forces into northern Iraq between 12 October and 1 November 1992 against the Kurdistan Workers Party (PKK) which is listed as a terrorist organization internationally by a number of states and organizations, including the United States, NATO and the EU. More than 37,000 people have been killed in the Kurdish–Turkish conflict since 1984.

Prelude 
On April 8, 1992, Iraqi Kurdish leaders agreed to stop the PKK's raids into Turkey from their territory in an attempt to create good relations with Turkey. In response, the PKK cut supply routes from Turkey to Iraqi Kurdistan on July 31. To re-open the supply roots, Peshmerga loyal to the Kurdistan Democratic Party and the Patriotic Union of Kurdistan (Iraqi Kurdistan's ruling parties), started an offensive on October 4 to drive the PKK from Northern Iraq.

The Operation 
On August 6, the Turkish Air Force launched air raids to support Iraqi Kurdish forces in their offensive against the PKK. After the air raids, Turkey launched an operation against the PKK, using 20,000 ground troops, backed by tanks, helicopters and aircraft. It was estimated the PKK had over 8,000 fighters in the region. Turkey claimed to have killed and captured nearly 3 thousand PKK fighters and wounded 2,700 by November 5, with over 1,000 surrendering to Iraqi Kurdish forces, a number which rose to 1,400 by 12 November. In mid-November Turkish forces started to withdraw after claiming to have reduced the PKK's fighting force to a mere 2,500. The PKK acknowledged only 150 casualties.

Most of the PKK's strength, including most of their experienced fighters, were based inside of Turkey at the time and so they lacked both manpower and resources inside Iraq. As supplies started to run out and PKK commanders also found it increasingly difficult to communicate with Abdullah Öcalan in Syria. Therefore, his brother Osman Öcalan agreed to meet with Prime Minister of Iraqi Kurdistan Fuad Masum on October 30 to negotiate. The negotiations were supported by Faruk "Nasir" Bozkur but were opposed by Murat "Cemal" Karayılan, which were the two other main commanders in Northern Iraq. On November 17, the Kurdistan Regional Government (KRG) and the PKK reached a truce accord under which the PKK would re-open all routes to Turkey and release 2 captured Turkish soldiers. A buffer zone between Iraq and Turkey was to be created to prevent further PKK activities, however, according to Turkish officials this did not happen due to a lack of cooperation from the KRG.

Casualties 
Turkey announced fatalities at a total of 28 personnel made out of 1 commissioned officer, 3 noncommissioned officers, 22 soldiers and 2 village guards. Turkey announced the injured at a total of 125 personnel made out of 12 commissioned officers 16 noncommissioned officers, 93 soldiers, and 4 village guards. Turkey announced the total number of militants neutralized at a total of 2,783 with 1,551 being killed and 1,232 being captured.

References 

History of the Kurdistan Workers' Party
1992 in Turkey
1992 in Iraq
Conflicts in 1992
Cross-border operations of Turkey into Iraq